Two Lanes of Freedom is the twelfth studio album by American country music singer Tim McGraw. It was released February 5, 2013, as his first album for Big Machine Records following 20 years with Curb Records. He co-produced the album with Byron Gallimore, the producer of his previously released albums. The album includes the singles "Truck Yeah", "One of Those Nights", "Highway Don't Care" with Taylor Swift and "Southern Girl".

Background
McGraw told The Boot writer Beville Dunkerley about the lawsuit that allowed him to end his decades-long contract with Curb Records and the making of the album. "Nothing good happens from anything without concentrating on what you do musically,... All this other stuff you can't do anything about...You can't make people do the things that you think are right, but you can make your music the way you want to make your music and that's what I concentrate on." Of his "mindset" behind the album, he said, "There's something special about this record to me, in the optimism that it has,...I'm looking forward to more stuff than I've ever had happen before; there's more ahead of me than behind me. I feel like I've grabbed another gear." He added what he sees in his future as a music artist, "I don't think I'm anywhere close to doing the things I want to do. There's so much more ahead of me, and I have a lot of room to get better... Sonically, there's a freshness to this record and a drive behind it that is new to me and headed in a different place. But I won't know that until I go into the studio for the next record and see where it takes me."

Reception

Critical

On release, Two Lanes of Freedom received generally positive reviews from most music critics. At Metacritic, which assigns a normalized rating out of 100 to reviews from mainstream critics, the album received an average score of 66, based on 9 reviews, which indicates "generally favorable reviews". The album had positive reviews from AllMusic, American Songwriter, Country Weekly, The Lantern The Plain Dealer, Roughstock, Taste of Country and USA Today. On the other hand, the album received mixed reviews from Country Universe, Los Angeles Times, Omaha World-Herald, PopMatters and Rolling Stone.

Commercial
Two Lanes of Freedom sold approximately 107,000 copies during its first week of release, reaching No. 1 on the country albums chart and No. 2 on the Billboard 200. By September 18, 2013, the album had sold 421,000 copies.

Track listing
All tracks are produced by Byron Gallimore and Tim McGraw.

Personnel

Musicians
 Tim McGraw – lead vocals
 Jamie Muhoberac – keyboards
 Steve Nathan – acoustic piano, Wurlitzer electric piano, organ, synthesizers
 Mike Rojas – accordion (9)
 David Levita – electric guitar, acoustic guitar (1)
 Michael Landau – electric guitar, guitar solo (3)
 Ilya Toshinsky – acoustic guitar, resonator guitar (1, 7)
 Bryan Sutton – acoustic guitar (4, 6, 11), mandolin (4, 6, 11), banjo (5)
 Keith Urban – electric guitar (13)
 Dan Dugmore – steel guitar, lap steel guitar
 Paul Bushnell – bass guitar
 Shannon Forrest – drums, percussion
 Byron Gallimore – percussion (6), backing vocals (9)
 Marty Krystall – clarinet (9)
 Lee Thornburg – trumpet (9)
 William Roper – tuba (9)
 David Campbell – string arrangements (3, 7, 8, 10, 12), horn arrangements (9)
 The Nashville String Machine - strings (3, 7, 8, 10, 12)
 Greg Barnhill – backing vocals
 Joanna Cotten – backing vocals (2, 11)
 Chris Rodriguez – backing vocals (12)
 Taylor Swift – lead and backing vocals (13)

Musicians on "Truck Yeah (Live)"
 Tim McGraw – lead vocals
 Billy Nobel – keyboards, backing vocals 
 Adam Shoenfeld – electric guitar 
 Denny Hemingson – Melobar guitar
 Deano Brown – fiddle, backing vocals 
 John Marcus – bass guitar
 Shawn Fichter – drums

Production
 Byron Gallimore – producer, mixing (15)
 Tim McGraw – producer
 Julian King – recording (1-13), string recording (3, 7)
 Heath Stimmel – recording (14)
 Steve Churchyard – string recording (8, 10, 12), horn recording (9)
 Chris Lord-Alge – mixing (1–14)
 Stephen Allbritten – additional recording (1–14), recording assistant (1–14)
 Erik Lutkins – additional recording (1–14), mix assistant (15)
 David Bryant – recording assistant (1–13), string recording assistant (3, 7)
 Lowell Reynolds – recording assistant (1-13)
 Andrew Schubert – additional mixing (1–14), mix assistant (1–14)
 Brad Townsend – additional mixing (1–14), mix assistant (1–14)
 Keith Armstrong – mix assistant (1–14)
 Nik Karpen – mix assistant (1–14)
 Ted Jensen – mastering 
 Sandi Spika Borchetta – creative director
 Kelly Clauge – creative director
 Glenn Sweitzer – art direction, design 
 Nigel Parry – photography

Studios
 Recorded at Blackbird Studios (Nashville, Tennessee) and Essential Sound Studios (Franklin, Tennessee)
 Strings recorded at Blackbird Studios (Nashville, Tennessee) and Ocean Way Recording Hollywood, California)
 Mixed at Mix L.A. (Tarzana, California) and Essential Sound Studios (Franklin, Tennessee)
 Mastered at Sterling Sound (New York City, New York)

Chart performance

Weekly charts

Year-end charts

Singles

Certifications

References

External links
Billboard magazine article

2013 albums
Tim McGraw albums
Big Machine Records albums
Albums produced by Byron Gallimore
Albums produced by Tim McGraw